Gustaf Andersson (born 6 November 1979) is a retired Swedish football defender. After his career he changed his last name to Crona.

References

1979 births
Living people
Swedish footballers
Örebro SK players
Landskrona BoIS players
Sandefjord Fotball players
Association football defenders
Allsvenskan players
Eliteserien players
Swedish expatriate footballers
Expatriate footballers in Norway
Swedish expatriate sportspeople in Norway